Truckbhar Swapna is an Indian Marathi language film directed by Pramod Pawar and produced by Nitin Chandrakant Desai. The film starring Makarand Deshpande , Kranti Redkar, Aditi Pohankar, Mukesh Rishi and Smita Tambe.The film was released on 24 August 2018.

Synopsis 
An honest taxi driver in Mumbai plans to extend his house to provide better for his family. However, he is forced to deal with corrupt officials and a lecherous contractor along the way.

Cast 
 Makarand Deshpande as Raja Kadam 
 Kranti Redkar as Rani 
 Smita Tambe
 Aditi Pohankar as Kajal 
 Mukesh Rishi as Civil contractor RK

Production 
Principal photography began on 13 April 2016.

Soundtrack

Critical response 
Mukund Kule of The Times of India gave the film 2.5 stars out of 5 and wrote "In the technical aspects, the film is just alright and there is nothing that helps make it stand out. Had it been given a better treatment and a little more thought, Truckbhar Swapna could've been a good watch". Ganesh Matkari of Pune Mirror wrote "The film neatly writes the message down in case you have not understood it after watching the entire film. That’s a big help, as I am not sure you will get it otherwise". Keyur Seta of Cinestaan.com gave the film 1 stars out of 5 and wrote "While he shows some maturity in his act, you can’t help but wonder what made him choose Truckbhar Swapna as his comeback film". A Reviewer of Maharashtra Times gave the film 2.5 stars out of 5 and wrote "Makarand falls a bit short for this role. Because he looks like 'Makarand Deshpande' even in the role of a Raja. Both Kranti Redkar and Smita Tambe have done exceptionally well". Prajakta Chitnis of Lokmat gave the film 2.5 stars out of 5 and says "While watching the movie, it feels like a real slum in Mumbai. Also, the colors and costumes of the characters in the film have been put together very well".

References

External links
 
 

2018 films
2010s Marathi-language films
Indian drama films